Delaware County Regional Airport  is in Delaware County, Indiana three miles northwest of Muncie. Owned by the Delaware County Airport Authority, it was formerly Delaware County Airport and Johnson Field. The National Plan of Integrated Airport Systems for 2011–2015 categorized it as a general aviation facility.

Facilities
The airport covers 963 acres (390 ha) at an elevation of 937 feet (286 m). It has two asphalt runways: 14/32 is 6,500 by 150 feet (1,981 x 46 m) and 2/20 is 5,198 by 100 feet (1,584 x 30 m).

In 2010 the airport had 23,644 aircraft operations, average 64 per day: 95% general aviation, 3% military, 2% air taxi, and 0% airline. It was home base to 22 aircraft: 86.5% single-engine, 4.5% multi-engine, 4.5% jet, and 4.5% helicopter.

Scheduled airlines
Airline flights started in 1958—Lake Central DC-3s. In 1981 Allegheny Commuter flew to Chicago-O'Hare and Indianapolis. By 1985 flights to Chicago were on Britt Airways and Indianapolis flights had ended. Great Lakes Airlines operated flights to and from Chicago's O'Hare International Airport in the 1990s.

Businesses 
 Muncie Aviation Company, the fixed-base operator (FBO).

References

External links 
 Official website
 
 Aerial image as of April 1998 from USGS The National Map
 
 

 http://www.muncie-airport.com/

Airports in Indiana
Transportation buildings and structures in Delaware County, Indiana
Former Essential Air Service airports